Acoustic Sessions may refer to:

 Acoustic Sessions (Juke Kartel EP), 2010 EP by Juke Kartel
 Acoustic Sessions (Harem Scarem EP), 1991 EP by Harem Scarem
 Acoustic Sessions (Cascada album), acoustic album by Cascada
 Acoustic Sessions (Shinedown EP), 2014 EP by Shinedown
 Acoustic Session (Emmelie de Forest EP)
Bad Wolves: Acoustic Sessions (Live)
 Killing Me Slowly (Live Acoustic)

See also 
 Acoustic (disambiguation)